Adelaide Connection is an Australian vocal jazz ensemble from the Elder Conservatorium of Music in Adelaide, South Australia. Their album with the Don Burrows Quintet, Nice 'n' Easy, was nominated for the 1988 ARIA Award for Best Jazz Album.

Musical directors have included John McKenzie, Connaitre Miller, Luke Thompson and Anita Wardle.

Discography

Albums

Awards and nominations

ARIA Awards
The ARIA Music Awards is an annual awards ceremony that recognises excellence, innovation, and achievement across all genres of Australian music. It commenced in 1987.

! 
|-
| 1988
| Nice 'n' Easy (with Don Burrows)
| Best Jazz Album
| 
| 
|}

References

Australian musical groups